Ptilotus clementii, commonly known as tassel top, is a native Australian annual herb growing to between 0.3 and 1 metre high. Nodding, green flower spikes are produced between March and November in the species' native range.

The species occurs in Triodia grassland or low open woodland on stony hills from Cape Range in Western Australia and eastward across the Northern Territory to north-west Queensland where it is restricted to the Mount Isa - Cloncurry area.

The species was first formally described in 1905 by L. Farmar in Bulletin de l'Herbier Boissieras. He gave it the name Trichinium clementii, basing his description on a collection made by Emile Clement between the Ashburton and De Grey Rivers in 1897. The species was transferred to the genus Ptilotus in 1958.

References

clementii
Flora of the Northern Territory
Flora of Queensland
Eudicots of Western Australia